Ravi Kumar Sawhney is an American industrial designer. He is the founder and CEO of RKS Design, co-founder (with Dave Mason) of RKS Guitars, and Chairperson of the IDSA/Business Week Catalyst Case Study Program. He was named a Fellow of the Industrial Designers Society of America in 2009.

References

External links 
 RKS
 RKS Guitars

1964 births
American industrial designers
Living people